Real World or The Real World may also refer to:

 Real life, a phrase to distinguish between the real world and fictional, virtual or idealized worlds

Television
 The Real World (TV series), 1992–2017
 "The Real World" (Stargate Atlantis), a 2006 episode

Music
 Real World (album), by Kokia, 2010
 Da Real World, by Missy Elliott, 1999
 "Real World" (Matchbox Twenty song), 1998
 "Real World" (Queensrÿche song), 1993
 "Real World", a song by Pere Ubu, from the 1978 album The Modern Dance
 "Real World", a 2004 song by D-Side
 "Real World", a song by The All-American Rejects from their 2008 album When the World Comes Down
 "The Real World", a song by the Mighty Lemon Drops from the 1989 album Laughter
 "The Real World", a song by Owl City from the 2011 album All Things Bright and Beautiful
 "Real World", a song by Bruce Springsteen from the 1992 album Human Touch
 Real World Records, a record label
Real World Studios, the label's recording studio

Other uses
 The Real World?, a 1987 play by Michel Tremblay
 Real World (novel), a 2003 novel by Natsuo Kirino

See also

Real Life (disambiguation)
In Real Life (disambiguation)
The Challenge (TV series), later Real World/Road Rules Challenge